Carry On Spying is a 1964 British spy comedy film, the ninth in the series of 31 Carry On films (1958–1992). It marks Barbara Windsor's first appearance in the series. Series regulars Kenneth Williams, Charles Hawtrey, and Jim Dale are present. Bernard Cribbins makes the second of his three Carry On appearances (although it would be 28 years before he returned in Carry On Columbus). Eric Barker appears for his third entry (his final appearance would be in Carry On Emmannuelle 14 years later). Dilys Laye returns after her series debut in Carry On Cruising. This is the last film of the series to be shot in black and white.

Plot
A top-secret chemical formula has been stolen by STENCH (the Society for the Total Extinction of Non-Conforming Humans). Fearful of the formula falling into the wrong hands, the chief of the Secret Service reluctantly sends the only agent he has left, the bumbling and silly Agent Desmond Simpkins and his three trainees — Agent Harold Crump, Agent Daphne Honeybutt, and Agent Charlie Bind — to retrieve the formula.

The agents travel separately to Vienna, where each makes contact with Carstairs, who assumes a different disguise each time. Next, they rendezvous at the Cafe Mozart and later travel on to Algiers. Upon the way, they encounter STENCH agents the Fat Man and Milchmann (who stole the formula whilst disguised—befitting the English translation of his German name—as a milkman). Unfortunately, the agents' ineptitude results in Carstairs being floored in an encounter with the Fat Man.

Daphne and Harold attempt to steal the formula back whilst disguised as dancing girls in Hakim's Fun House, where the Fat Man is relaxing. The agents also encounter the mysterious Lila, whom they are uncertain to trust. With the STENCH henchmen close on their heels, the agents have no other choice but to have Daphne memorise the formula with her photographic memory, before the four of them destroy the formula papers by eating them with soup and bread.

The four agents end up captives of STENCH. Daphne is interrogated by the evil Dr Crow (played by Judith Furse and voiced by John Bluthal), head of STENCH, but she fails to succumb until she accidentally bumps her head, causing her to reveal the formula. Simpkins, Crump, and Bind manage to escape their cell and to collect Daphne and Dr. Crow's tape recording of Daphne's recitation, but are caught up in an underground automated factory process, from which they escape only when Lila pulls a gun on Dr Crow, forcing her to reverse the process.

Simpkins sets the STENCH base to self-destruct before rushing into a lift with the other agents, as well as Lila and Dr Crow. As the lift ascends, Lila reveals to Simpkins that she is a double agent working for SNOG (the Society for the Neutralising of Germs) and that she has a crush on him. The lift reaches the surface, which is revealed to be the office of the chief of the Secret Service; the headquarters of STENCH is right below the streets of London. STENCH headquarters self-destructs, choking the chief's office in a thick cloud of smoke.

Cast
 Kenneth Williams as Desmond Simkins (codename Red Admiral)
 Barbara Windsor as Daphne Honeybutt (codename Brown Cow)
 Charles Hawtrey as Charlie Bind (codename Yellow Peril)
 Bernard Cribbins as Harold Crump (codename Bluebottle)
 Jim Dale as Carstairs
 Eric Barker as The Chief
 Richard Wattis as Cobley
 Dilys Laye as Lila
 Eric Pohlmann as The Fat Man
 Victor Maddern as Milchmann
 Judith Furse as Dr. Crow

Crew
 Screenplay – Talbot Rothwell & Sid Colin
 Music – Eric Rogers
 Songs – "Too Late" by Alex Alstone & Geoffrey Parsons and "The Magic of Love" by Eric Rogers
 Associate Producer – Frank Bevis
 Art Director – Alex Vetchinsky
 Director of Photography – Alan Hume
 Editor – Archie Ludski
 Camera Operator – Godfrey Godar
 Assistant Director – Peter Bolton
 Unit Manager – Donald Toms
 Continuity – Penny Daniels
 Hairdressing – Biddy Chrystal
 Sound Editor – Christopher Lancaster
 Sound Recordists – CC Stevens & Bill Daniels
 Costume Designer – Yvonne Caffin
 Make-up – WT Partleton
 Producer – Peter Rogers
 Director – Gerald Thomas

Production
Albert R. Broccoli, the producer of the James Bond film series, objected to the character name "James Bind agent 006½" (intended for Charles Hawtrey) and threatened legal action. Hence, producer Peter Rogers changed the name to Charlie and the agent's code number to double 0 – ooh! Poster artist Tom Chantrell also had to modify the film poster when similar complaints were voiced that the artwork was too similar to Renato Fratini's From Russia with Love poster.

The film pokes fun at various spy films, the James Bond series being the least of them. They include The Third Man (coincidentally, Eric Pohlmann, who plays The Fat Man, had a minor part in The Third Man and was the voice of SPECTRE No 1 in From Russia with Love). One or two of Crow's female assistants wear hairstyles similar to that of Modesty Blaise, whose adventures had started in the London Evening Standard the previous year.

Filming and locations
 Filming dates – 8 February–13 March 1964

Interiors:
 Pinewood Studios, Buckinghamshire

Critical reception
Carry On Spying received critical acclaim, with critics praising its fast pace, satirical intent, and Kenneth Williams' performance which was largely based on his "Snide" persona from Hancock's Half Hour. On Rotten Tomatoes it has an approval rating of 83% based on 6 reviews.

Kinematograph Weekly called the film a "money maker" for 1964.

Bibliography
 
 
 
 
 Keeping the British End Up: Four Decades of Saucy Cinema by Simon Sheridan (third edition) (2007) (Reynolds & Hearn Books)

References

External links
 
 
 
 
 Carry On Spying at The Whippit Inn
 Carry On Spying review at Empire

1964 films
1964 comedy films
1960s parody films
1960s spy comedy films
British black-and-white films
British parody films
British spy comedy films
Spying
1960s English-language films
Films directed by Gerald Thomas
Films set in London
Films set in Algiers
Films set in Vienna
Films shot at Pinewood Studios
Films produced by Peter Rogers
Films with screenplays by Talbot Rothwell
Films with screenplays by Sid Colin
Parody films based on James Bond films